The 2008 All-SEC football team consists of American football players selected to the All-Southeastern Conference (SEC) chosen by the Associated Press (AP) and the conference coaches for the 2008 college football season.

The Florida Gators won the conference, beating the Alabama Crimson Tide 31 to 20 in the SEC Championship game. The Gators then won a national championship, defeating the Big 12 champion Oklahoma Sooners 24 to 14 in the 2009 BCS National Championship Game. Alabama led the conference with five consensus first-team All-SEC selections by both the AP and the coaches; Florida was second with three.

Florida quarterback Tim Tebow, a unanimous AP selection, was voted AP SEC Offensive Player of the Year. Georgia running back Knowshon Moreno was a unanimous selection by both AP and the coaches. Tennessee safety Eric Berry, a unanimous selection by the coaches, was voted AP SEC Defensive Player of the Year.

Offensive selections

Quarterbacks
 Tim Tebow*, Florida (AP-1, Coaches-1)
 Matthew Stafford, Georgia (AP-2, Coaches-2)

Running backs
 Knowshon Moreno†, Georgia (AP-1, Coaches-1)
 Glen Coffee, Alabama (AP-1, Coaches-2)
Charles Scott, LSU (AP-2, Coaches-1)
Michael Smith, Arkansas (AP-2, Coaches-2)

Wide receivers
 A. J. Green, Georgia (AP-1, Coaches-2)
Percy Harvin, Florida (AP-2, Coaches-1)
Mohamed Massaquoi, Georgia (AP-2, Coaches-1)
Brandon LaFell, LSU (AP-1)
Julio Jones, Alabama (AP-2, Coaches-2)

Centers
 Antoine Caldwell, Alabama (AP-1, Coaches-1)
Jonathan Luigs, Arkansas (AP-2, Coaches-2)

Guards
Herman Johnson, LSU (AP-1, Coaches-1)
Clint Boling, Georgia (AP-1)
Mike Johnson, Alabama (AP-2, Coaches-2)
Mike Pouncey, Florida (Coaches-2)

Tackles
Michael Oher*, Ole Miss (AP-1, Coaches-1)
Andre Smith*, Alabama (AP-1, Coaches-1)
Phil Trautwein, Florida (AP-1, Coaches-1)
Ciron Black, LSU (AP-2, Coaches-2)
Garry Williams, Kentucky (AP-2, Coaches-2)
Anthony Parker, Tennessee (AP-2, Coaches-2)
John Jerry, Ole Miss (Coaches-2)

Tight ends
 D. J. Williams, Arkansas (AP-1, Coaches-2)
Jared Cook, South Carolina (AP-2)
Richard Dickson, LSU (Coaches-2)

Defensive selections

Defensive ends
 Antonio Coleman, Auburn (AP-1, Coaches-1) 
 Robert Ayers, Tennessee (AP-2, Coaches-1) 
 Rahim Allen, LSU (AP-1) 
 Jermaine Cunningham, Florida (AP-2) 
 Carlos Dunlap, Florida (AP-2) 
 Greg Hardy, Ole Miss (Coaches-2)

Defensive tackles 
 Terrence Cody, Alabama (AP-1, Coaches-1)
Peria Jerry, Ole Miss (AP-1, Coaches-1)
Myron Pryor, Kentucky (AP-2, Coaches-2)
Malcolm Sheppard, Arkansas (AP-2, Coaches-2)
SenDerrick Marks, Auburn (Coaches-2)

Linebackers
Brandon Spikes*, Florida (AP-1, Coaches-1)
Rolando McClain, Alabama (AP-1, Coaches-1)
Eric Norwood, South Carolina (AP-1, Coaches-1)
Rennie Curran, Georgia (AP-2, Coaches-1)
Micah Johnson, Kentucky (Coaches-1)
Dominic Douglas, Miss. St. (AP-2, Coaches-2)
Patrick Benoist, Vanderbilt (AP-2, Coaches-2)
Darry Beckwith, LSU (AP-2)
Jasper Brinkley, South Carolina (Coaches-2)
Rico McCoy, Tennessee (Coaches-2)

Cornerbacks
 Trevard Lindley, Kentucky (AP-1, Coaches-1) 
D. J. Moore, Vanderbilt (AP-1, Coaches-1)
Javier Arenas, Alabama (AP-2, Coaches-2)
Joe Haden, Florida (AP-2, Coaches-2)

Safeties 
 Rashad Johnson*, Alabama (AP-1, Coaches-1)
 Eric Berry#, Tennessee  (AP-1, Coaches-1)
Emanuel Cook, South Carolina (AP-2, Coaches-2)
Reshad Jones, Georgia (AP-2)
Ahmad Black, Florida (Coaches-2)
Derek Pegues, Miss. St. (Coaches-2)

Special teams

Kickers
 Joshua Shene, Ole Miss (AP-1, Coaches-2)
Colt David, LSU (AP-2, Coaches-1)

Punters
 Tim Masthay, Kentucky (AP-1, Coaches-1)
Brian Mimbs, Ole Miss (AP-2, Coaches-2)
Jeremy Davis, Arkansas (AP-2)
Chas Henry, Florida (Coaches-2)

All purpose/return specialist
Percy Harvin, Florida (AP-1)
Dexter McCluster, Ole Miss (AP-2)
Brandon James, Florida (Coaches-1)
Javier Arenas, Alabama (Coaches-2)

Key
Bold = Consensus first-team selection by both the coaches and AP

AP = Associated Press

Coaches = Selected by the SEC coaches

* = Unanimous selection of AP

# = Unanimous selection of Coaches

† = Unanimous selection of both AP and Coaches

See also
2008 College Football All-America Team

References

All-Southeastern Conference
All-SEC football teams